La Russie opprimée ('Oppressed Russia') was a French language weekly publication, issued exiled Russian Social-Revolutionaries in Paris 1926–1933. La Russie opprimée was launched by Alexander Kerensky in 1926. The newspaper contained analysis of Soviet culture and politics, reviews of the Soviet press and polemics against pro-Soviet personalities in France. It carried the by-line 'Weekly socialist information bulletin'. Apart from Kerensky, other editors included O. Minor and V. Zenzinov. The office of La Russie opprimée was located in the 16th arrondissement of Paris.

References

1926 establishments in France
1933 disestablishments in France
Defunct newspapers published in France
Defunct weekly newspapers
Newspapers published in Paris
Publications established in 1926
Publications disestablished in 1933
Socialist newspapers